"Scream for More" is the debut single by the female Belgian dance singer Kate Ryan and was released on February 19, 2001, in Belgium by the label EMI-Belgium. It peaked at number nine on the charts in her homeland. It was also released in Spain shortly thereafter, where it failed to chart.

After Ryan's international success in 2002 and 2003 with two cover versions, she released a new version of "Scream for More" in Austria, Denmark, the Netherlands and other countries with little success.

Formats and track listings
CD Single
"Scream for More" - 4:00
"Scream for More" (Original Extended Mix) - 7:51
12" Single
"Scream for More" (Original Extended Mix) - 7:51
"Scream for More" (Club Dub) - 9:08
"Scream for More" (Orphean Remix) - 6:14
"Scream for More" (D&A Mix) - 5:50

Official versions
 2002 Version - 3:46
 Original Extended - 7:51
 Extended 2 - 7:52
 USA Mix - 7:51
 D&A Remix - 5:50
 Orphean Remix - 6:14
 Club Dub - 9:08

Charts

Weekly charts

Year-end charts

References

2001 songs
2001 debut singles
Kate Ryan songs
Songs written by Kate Ryan
EMI Records singles